The Andamanese languages are a pair of language families spoken by the Andamanese peoples of the Andaman Islands in the Indian Ocean. The two language families are Great Andamanese and Ongan, while the Sentinelese language is spoken by an uncontacted people and therefore at present unclassifiable.

History 
The indigenous Andamanese people have lived on the islands for thousands of years. Although the existence of the islands and their inhabitants was long known to maritime powers and traders of the South– and Southeast–Asia region, contact with these peoples was highly sporadic and very often hostile; as a result, almost nothing is recorded of them or their languages until the mid-18th century. By the late 18th century, when the British first established a colonial presence on the Andaman islands, there were an estimated 5,000 Great Andamanese living on Great Andaman and surrounding islands, comprising 10 distinct tribes with distinct but closely related languages. From the 1860s onwards, the  British established a penal colony on the islands, which led to the subsequent arrival of mainland settlers and indentured labourers, mainly from the Indian subcontinent. This coincided with the massive population reduction of the Andamanese due to outside diseases, to a low of 19 individuals in 1961.

One of the first accounts in English of the languages was by the early phonetician Alexander John Ellis, who presented to the Philological Society on the South Andamanese languages on his retirement.  This presentation was later adapted into a Report of Researches into the Language of the South Andaman Island.

By the beginning of the 20th century most of these populations were greatly reduced in numbers, and the various linguistic and tribal divisions among the Great Andamanese effectively ceased to exist, despite a census of the time still classifying the groups as separate. Their linguistic diversity also suffered as the surviving populations intermingled with one another, and some also intermarried with Karen (Burmese) and Indian settlers.

By the latter part of the 20th century the majority of Great Andamanese languages had become extinct.

At the start of the 21st century only about 50 or so individuals of Great Andamanese descent remained, resettled to a single small island (Strait I.); about half of these speak what may be considered a modified version (or creole) of Great Andamanese, based mainly on Aka-Jeru. This modified version has been called "Present Great Andamanese" by some scholars, but also may be referred to simply as "Jero" or "Great Andamanese". Hindi increasingly serves as their primary language, and is the only language for around half of them.

The Ongan languages survive mainly because of the greater isolation of the peoples who speak them. This isolation has been reinforced by an outright hostility towards outsiders and extreme reluctance to engage in contact with them by South Andamanese tribes, particularly the Sentinelese and Jarawa. The Sentinelese have been so resistant that their language remains entirely unknown to outsiders.

Grammar

The Andamanese languages are agglutinative languages, with an extensive prefix and suffix system.  They have a distinctive noun class system based largely on body parts, in which every noun and adjective may take a prefix according to which body part it is associated with (on the basis of shape, or functional association). Thus, for instance, the "aka-" at the beginning of the Great Andamanese languages' names is a prefix for objects related to the tongue.  (See Great Andamanese languages for examples.) Terms for body parts are inalienably possessed, requiring a possessive adjective prefix to complete them, so one cannot say "head" alone, but only "my, or his, or your, etc. head".

The basic pronouns are almost identical throughout the Great Andamanese languages; Aka-Bea will serve as a representative example (pronouns given in their basic prefixal forms):

The Ongan pronouns are rather different; Önge is cited here:

Judging from the available sources, the Andamanese languages have only two cardinal numbers: one and two and their entire numerical lexicon is one, two, one more, some more, and all.

Lexicon

Abbi (2009) lists the following lexical items for Onge, Jarawa, and Great Andamanese, showing that Ongan and Great Andamanese are distinct language families sharing few lexical similarities.

{| class="wikitable sortable"
! English !! Onge !! Jarawa !! Great Andamanese
|-
! boat
| ɖaŋɛ cɨ || (cagiya paɖa)-taŋ/daŋ || rowa
|-
! bow
| ɪja || aːw || ko
|-
! child
| ɨcɨʐɨ || ɨcɨʐə || ʈʰire
|-
! crocodile
| ʈɔjəgɨ || torogijəi || sare-ka-teo
|-
! crows
| wawa-le || waːraw || pʰaʈka
|-
! dog
| wəːme, uame || wɔm || caːw
|-
! goat
| ʈikʷabuli || tʰikʰwa-gopejajo || –
|-
! laugh
| ɨɲja || əniaː || kʰole
|-
! water
| ɨɲe || iːɲ || ino
|-
! 1SG (I)
| mi || mi || ʈʰu
|-
! 2SG (you)
| ɲi || ɲi || ɲ
|-
! forehead
| -ejale || -ejea || -beŋ
|-
! eye
| -ejebo || -ejebo || -ulu
|-
! ear
| -ekʷagɨ || -ikʰəwə || -boa
|-
! elbow
| -ito-ge || -itʰo-ha || -bala-tara ɖole
|-
! wrist
| -moɲa-ge || -eɲia || -ʈʰo
|-
! palm
| -obanaŋ-ge || -obaŋna || -koro
|-
! thumb
| -oboʈa-ge || -obotʰa || -kənap
|-
! thigh
| -ibo || -ibə || -buco
|-
! knee
| -ola-ge || -olak ~ -ola || -curok
|-
! sole
| -ubtəga-me || -ugɖaga || -moʈora-ɖole
|-
! neck
| -aŋgiʈo || -agiʈʰo || -loŋɔ
|}

Below are Proto-Ongan reconstructions from Blevins (2007) compared with Great Andamanese lexical items from Abbi (2011).

{| class="wikitable sortable"
! gloss !! Proto-Ongan !! Great Andamanese
|-
! head
| *-otab || ɛr-co
|-
! hair (of head)
| *-ode || ot-bec
|-
! eye
| *-ecebo < *eca-ipo || er-ulu
|-
! ear
| *-ikwag || er-buo
|-
! nose
| *-iɲjan-ipo || er-kɔʈʰo
|-
! tooth
| *-akwed || er-pʰile, ɸile
|-
! tongue
| *-adalaŋ || ɑ-tɑt
|-
! mouth
| *-alaŋ || er-pʰoŋ
|-
! hand
| *-ome || er-ʈoŋ
|-
! foot
| *uge || u-mɔʈo
|-
! breast
| *-akak || er-me-tɛi
|-
! meat, flesh
|  || e-tʰomo
|-
! blood
| *-aceŋ || e-tei
|-
! bone
| *daŋ || e-tɔe, o-ʈɔy
|-
! person
| *eŋ, *əŋ (< *en) || 
|-
! name
| *-atiba || liu
|-
! dog
| *wem(e) || cɑo
|-
! fish
| *napo || ʈɑjeo
|-
! louse
| *kuhi || kɔemo
|-
! tree
| *taŋ 'tree, log' || ɛʈ-ʈole 'wood'
|-
! leaf
| *bebe || tec
|-
! flower
| *okw || ʈɔl, ʈɔlo
|-
! water
| *iŋ || ino
|-
! fire
| *tuke || ɑʈ; luro
|-
! stone
| *uli || meo
|-
! earth
| *bela || buɑ
|-
! salt
|  || sɑre
|-
! road, path
| *icala || ɲɔrtɔ
|-
! eat
| *-ita || ɲɑ; iji
|-
! die
| *peca-me || em-pʰil
|}

The languages and their classification

The Andaman languages fall into two clear families,
Great Andamanese: Spoken by the Great Andamanese people; Aka-Jeru, had 36 speakers in 1997 who are bilingual in Andaman Creole Hindi.
Ongan: Two languages spoken by 300 people, mostly monolingual.

In addition, there is the unattested language
 Sentinelese; likely at least 50 speakers, and perhaps up towards 250 (the population of the Sentinelese people is unknown).

These have frequently been assumed to be related. However, the similarities between Great Andamanese and Ongan are so far mainly of a typological morphological nature, with little demonstrated common vocabulary. As a result, even long-range researchers such as Joseph Greenberg have expressed doubts as to the validity of Andamanese as a family.

Blevins (2007) summarizes,

As alluded to in this quotation, Greenberg proposed that the Great Andamanese are related to western Papuan languages as members of a phylum he called Indo-Pacific, but this is not generally accepted by other linguists. Stephen Wurm states that the lexical similarities between Great Andamanese and the West Papuan and certain languages of Timor "are quite striking and amount to virtual formal identity […] in a number of instances", but considers this to be due to a linguistic substratum rather than a direct relationship. Blevins (2007) proposes that the Ongan languages are related to Austronesian in an Austronesian–Ongan family, for which she has attempted to establish regular sound correspondences. The proposed connection between Austronesian and Ongan has not been supported by Austronesianists, and Robert Blust (2014) finds that Blevins' conclusions are not supported by her data: Of her first 25 reconstructions, none are reproducible using the comparative method, and Blust concludes that the grammatical comparison does not hold up. Blust, in addition, cites non-linguistic (such as cultural, archaeological, and biological) evidence against Blevins' hypothesis.

See also
Kusunda language#Classification

References

Bibliography
Abbi, Anvita. 2006. Endangered Languages of the Andaman Islands. LINCOM Studies in Asian Linguistics, 64. München: Lincom Europa. 

Burenhult, Niclas. 1996. Deep linguistic prehistory with particular reference to Andamanese.  Working Papers 45, 5–24. Lund University: Department of Linguistics.
Man, E.H.
Dictionary of the South Andaman Language, British India Press: Bombay 1923.
 On the Aboriginal Inhabitants of the Andaman Islands. The Journal of the Anthropological Institute of Great Britain and Ireland, Vol. 12, 1883.
Manoharan, S. 1997. "Pronominal Prefixes and Formative Affixes in Andamanese Language." Anvita Abbi (ed.). The Languages of Tribal and Indigenous Peoples of India. The Ethnic Space. Delhi: Motilal Benarsidass.
Portman, M.V. 1887. A Manual of the Andamanese Languages. London: W.H. Allen & Co.
Temple, Richard C. A Grammar of the Andamanese Languages, being Chapter IV of Part I of the Census Report on the Andaman and Nicobar Islands, Superintendent's Printing Press: Port Blair 1902.
Zide, Norman Herbert & V. Pandya. 1989. "A Bibliographical Introduction to Andamanese Linguistics." Journal of the American Oriental Society 109: 639–51.

External links
South Asia Bibliography – Andamanese
Andaman Association
Vanishing Voices of the Great Andamanese Anvita Abbi, Jawaharlal Nehru University
The Andamanese Language Family (I) & (II)
Burenhult's Paper on Andamanese
Another link to Burenhult on Andamanese

 
Languages of India
Proposed language families